Yang Yiming (born 25 May 1995) is a Chinese footballer currently playing as a centre-back or forward for Shijiazhuang Ever Bright.

Club career
Yang Yiming would make his debut for Shijiazhuang Ever Bright, initially as a forward on 29 June 2016 in a Chinese FA Cup game against Hebei China Fortune FC that ended in a 3–2 defeat. He would go on to score his first goal for the club on 28 October 2018 in a league game against Yanbian FC that ended in a 3–0 victory. He would be moved to centre-back and go on to establish himself as a regular with the club in the 2019 league campaign where he would help the team to a runners-up position and promotion into the top tier.

Career statistics

References

External links

1995 births
Living people
Chinese footballers
Association football forwards
Chinese Super League players
China League One players
Cangzhou Mighty Lions F.C. players